Sister Ruth Lautt is an American Roman Catholic nun and activist.  She is the founder of Christians for Fair Witness on the Middle East, an organization that describes itself as an advocacy group that works among mainline Protestants and Roman Catholics in North America for fairness in the churches’ witness on issues related to the conflict between Israel and its Arab neighbors.

Career

Lautt holds a J.D. from New York University School of Law.  Before entering the religious life as a Dominican nun, Sister Ruth was a litigator with Manhattan law firm of Skadden, Arps, Slate, Meagher & Flom.

Issue positions

Lautt advocates a two-state solution to the Israeli-Arab conflict.

Lautt has questioned the criticisms leveled at Israel by some churches, asking, "how people feel they have the right in the name of peace and justice, to tell other people not to try to preserve their own lives... You’re not obligated to lay down and die.”

See also

References

External links
 http://www.christianfairwitness.com/dev/speaks.html

Roman Catholic activists
Living people
Year of birth missing (living people)